Antonio Fernández Bordas (12 January 1870– 18 February 1950) was a Spanish violinist and musical teacher.

Spanish classical violinists
Male classical violinists
Musicians from Galicia (Spain)
1870 births
1950 deaths
Spanish male musicians